William Vest (born June 6, 1995) is an American professional baseball pitcher for the Detroit Tigers of Major League Baseball (MLB). He previously played in MLB for the Seattle Mariners.

Career

Amateur career
Vest attended Ridge Point High School in Sienna, Texas. He played for the school's baseball team as a shortstop. He enrolled at Stephen F. Austin State University, where he played college baseball for the Stephen F. Austin Lumberjacks. Vest became a pitcher in college.

Detroit Tigers
Vest was drafted in the 12th round, 365th overall, by the Detroit Tigers in the 2017 MLB draft. Vest made his professional debut with the Low-A Connecticut Tigers, posting a 3-1 record and 2.83 ERA in 21 games. He split the 2018 season between the Single-A West Michigan Whitecaps and the High-A Lakeland Flying Tigers, recording a cumulative 4-4 record and 5.18 ERA in 30 appearances. In 2019, Vest split the year between Lakeland, the Double-A Erie SeaWolves, and the Triple-A Toledo Mud Hens, pitching to a 3-5 record and 3.27 ERA with 58 strikeouts in 55.0 innings of work in 37 games between the three teams.

Vest did not play in a game in 2020, as the minor league season was cancelled due to the COVID-19 pandemic.

Seattle Mariners
On December 10, 2020, the Seattle Mariners selected Vest from the Tigers in the Rule 5 draft. He made the Mariners' Opening Day roster. Vest made the Opening Day roster and made his major league debut in relief on Opening Day. On July 12, Vest was designated for assignment by Seattle after recording a 6.17 ERA in 32 relief appearances.

Detroit Tigers (second stint)
Vest cleared waivers and Seattle returned him to the Tigers on July 17, 2021. The Tigers assigned Vest to Toledo. Vest made the Tigers' Opening Day roster for the 2022 season.

On May 13, Vest picked up his first career save in a 4-2 victory over the Baltimore Orioles. He entered a bases-loaded situation with one out in the ninth inning, and struck out both batters he faced. On May 20, Vest was placed on the non-injury (COVID-19) inactive list. He returned to the Tigers on May 31.

See also
Rule 5 draft results

References

External links

Living people
1995 births
Baseball players from Houston
Major League Baseball pitchers
Seattle Mariners players
Detroit Tigers players
Stephen F. Austin Lumberjacks baseball players
Connecticut Tigers players
West Michigan Whitecaps players
Lakeland Flying Tigers players
Erie SeaWolves players
Toledo Mud Hens players
Mesa Solar Sox players